Dungeons and Dragons: Wrath of the Dragon God is a 2005 direct-to-dvd American fantasy adventure film directed by Gerry Lively and written by Brian Rudnick and Robert Kimmel. The second instalment in the Dungeons & Dragons film series, it serves as a stand-alone sequel to Dungeons & Dragons (2000), which in turn was based on role-playing game of the same name. The only returning actor is Bruce Payne, reprising his role as Damodar.

The film premiered at the Sci-Fi Channel on October 10, 2005. It was released in theaters in Europe as well as some parts of North America and Latin America, and released on DVD on February 7, 2006.

Dungeons & Dragons: Wrath of the Dragon God was followed by Dungeons & Dragons 3: The Book of Vile Darkness, released direct-to-DVD in the United Kingdom on August 9, 2012.

Plot summary
Set one hundred years after the first film, Damodar is revived after his defeat by Ridley Freeborn, having been cursed by his former master, Profion, to walk the earth as an undead entity. Driven insane by the curse, he seeks revenge against the kingdom of Izmir, and the descendants of those who defeated him.

After years of searching with the aid of two dark talon lizardfolk shaman, he locates the Orb of Faluzure, an ancient artifact linked to the power of Faluzure, a dragon god imprisoned under Saragasso's mountains.  With the Orb's power, he heals the curse, and prepares to awaken the dragon to destroy Izmir.

Lord Berek, a fighter and former captain of the king's guard, now a bored lord of the King, and Melora, his wife, a young mage, investigate reports of poison gas emanating from Saragasso's caves and find the still-slumbering dragon.  Researching the threat in Izmir's library, Melora excitedly reports to Oberon, the head of the Mages' Council, that Faluzure was imprisoned three thousand years ago by a powerful ancient civilization called the Turanians, who also created the Orb.  While trying to locate the Orb through magic, Melora is cursed by the much-more powerful Damodar, and begins dying slowly.

She hides her illness from Berek, who is appointed by the King to assemble a party of adventurers; small enough to infiltrate Damodar's lair undetected, but strong enough to face their enemies: Lux, a female barbarian, Dorian, a male Cleric of Obad-Hai, Ormaline, a female elven wizard, and Nim, a master thief. Together they resolve to locate the vault of the warlock Malek, a worshiper of the demon Juiblex who was gifted a magical scrying pool known as the Pool of Sight; Berek believes the pool will allow them to penetrate Damodar's defenses and reveal the orb's location.

The party sets out to locate Malek's Vault, while Oberon and the other mages try to decipher the tomes of Turanian magic in their library, to find a way to defeat the dragon. While traveling through a haunted forest, Berek's party catches the attention of the powerful lich Klaxx the Maligned, who offers his services to Damodar. Damodar does not trust him, but is confident that the Orb makes him more powerful than Klaxx. After confronting a white dragon, and losing Dorian in the fight, Berek's party finds the Pool of Sight, securing their way to Damodar's castle.  Confronting him, Berek manages to take advantage of his overconfidence and steal the Orb, though Ormaline and Nim are badly wounded before the wizard teleports them to the Temple of Obad-Hai. While Ormaline and Nim are treated by the clerics, Berek rides back to Izmir, Lux staying behind to delay demons summoned by Damodar.

Using his shape-changing abilities, Klaxx infiltrates Izmir's castle, kills Oberon in his bath, and assumes his shape.  When Berek returns with the Orb, Melora uses it to unlock a vault discovered beneath the castle, where the Turanians hid the secrets of their magic.  Klaxx reveals himself, stealing the Orb back and kills the King and many of the castle's inhabitants before returning the Orb to Damodar. Falazure awakens and destroys the Orb, regaining his godly power. Damodar asks Falazure to witness the city's destruction and to let him rule over its remains as Falazure's servant; the dragon god agrees, but demands tribute in the form of 100 human sacrifices for every new moon in honor of his release, to which Damodar also agrees.

While Berek rides in pursuit, Melora, who is near death, manages to decipher the Turanians' secrets and gains the blessing of Obad-Hai, who gifts her a new Orb. Berek and Lux meet up and confront Damodar, who no longer has the Orb's power. They force him to cancel Melora's curse and she rallies the remaining mages in a magical attack that defeats the dragon, sealing him away once more. Klaxx, who has no interest in helping Damodar, disappears with a laugh. In the aftermath, Izmir is rebuilt, with Berek immersed in his ministerial duties, and Melora appointed as the new head of the Council of Mages.  Lux, is shown to have fully recovered from their wounds. Nim and Ormaline are shown being approached by Dorian, implied to have both died and gone to the outer planes. Damodar is imprisoned in a dark dungeon beneath Izmir, but smiling to himself as if he is fully prepared to wait another hundred years to have his revenge.

Cast
 Bruce Payne as Damodar
 Mark Dymond as Berek
 Clemency Burton-Hill as Melora
 Ellie Chidzey as Lux
 Tim Stern as Nim
 Steven Elder as Dorian
 Lucy Gaskell as Ormaline
 Roy Marsden as Oberon
 Geoffrey T. Bersey as Galtar
 Leonas Ciunis as Old Mage
 Liubomiras Laucevicius as Mage #1
 Ervinas Peteraitis as Mage #2
 Vytautas Rumsas as Valerious
 David Merheb as Tibio
 Aurimas Meliesius as Klaxx
 Laurynas Jurgelis as Magmin
 Andrius Zebrauskas as Pico
 Arturas Orlauskas as Dandy
 Leonardas Pobedonoscevas as Barnaby
 Tauras Cizas as Warrior
 Tomas Vaitkus as Oarsman
 Arturas Builovas as Wicked Doctor
 Mykolas Dorofejus as Priest
 Ramunas Abukevicius as Priest of Obadhai
 Evaldas Leskauskas as Lizard Shaman #1
 Tomas Zaibus as Lizard Shaman #2
 Alex Schock as Lizard Shaman #3

Reception
IGN scored it 3 out of 10, stating that only hardcore D&D fans should check it out, though mostly due to references to the game itself. Monsters and Critics awarded it 2 out of 5, stating, "If Lord of the Rings showed us how the fantasy genre can be done right, Dungeons and Dragons - Wrath of the Dragon God shows us how it can be done horribly wrong." One reviewer stated that Bruce Payne's 'performance is still the highlight of this one'. Another reviewer stated that Bruce Payne 'steals the show.'

Sequel
A sequel, Dungeons & Dragons 3: The Book of Vile Darkness, was announced in 2011, and was released Direct-to-DVD in the United Kingdom on August 29, 2012.

References

External links 

Wrath of the Dragon God Interview at Sorcerer's Place

2000s American films
2000s English-language films
2000s fantasy adventure films
2005 films
2005 television films
American fantasy adventure films
American high fantasy films
American sequel films
American sword and sorcery films
Direct-to-video sequel films
Dungeons & Dragons films
Films about dragons
Films based on role-playing games
Films directed by Gerry Lively
Films scored by David Julyan
Films set in castles
Films shot in Lithuania
Syfy original films
Television sequel films